Fereyduni or Fereidooni may refer to:
 Fereyduni, Khuzestan
 Fereyduni, South Khorasan

See also
 Fereydun